Nordhümmling is a Samtgemeinde in the district Emsland in Lower Saxony, Germany.

The following towns are situated in Nordhümmling:

(Population 2005)

References 

Samtgemeinden in Lower Saxony